El derecho de nacer (English title:The right to be born) is a Mexican telenovela produced by Ernesto Alonso for Televisa in 1981. Based on the Cuban radionovela of the same name written by Félix B. Caignet adapted for TV by Fernanda Villeli and directed by Raúl Araiza.

Verónica Castro and Sergio Jiménez starred as protagonists, Erika Buenfil and Humberto Zurita starred as co-protagonist on their debut, while Ignacio López Tarso, Beatriz Castro and Malena Doria starred as main antagonists. With the participations of the first actresses María Rubio and Socorro Avelar.

Plot 
The story begins as a young woman seeks counsel by her doctor after she is left pregnant and debating if she should have an abortion. Her doctor calms her and tells her that he wants to share a story with her before she makes her decision. The doctor's name is Alberto Limonta and he begins recounting the story of the Del Junco family..... Don Rafael Del Junco (Ignacio López Tarso) is the severe patriarch of a respected Veracruz family and demands absolute obedience from his two daughters María Elena and Matilde (real-life sisters Verónica and Beatriz Castro) and his wife Dona Constancia.  María Elena manages to have an affair with a traveling salesman named Alfredo Martinez, played by Salvador Pineda. Martinez abandons her after knowing that she is pregnant with his child.

Don Rafael, in all of his fury sends María Elena and her black nanny María Dolores (Socorro Avelar) into hiding to avoid any scandals to his family. The two women are kept prisoners by Bruno, the foreman (Julio César Inbert), who is instructed by Don Rafael to kill the baby as soon as it is born. María Dolores manages to arrange the disappearance of the baby boy and instead flees to Mexico City while the boy Albertico played by Verónica Castro's real-life son Cristian Castro. Albertico Limonta, who took the last name of Maria Dolores, knows nothing about the existence of María Elena.

The storyline has Alberto going back to Veracruz as he takes a job as a resident at the city hospital.  It is there where he meets a young girl Amelia, who falls in love with him, but refuses to marry when she learns that Alberto has a black mother.  As Alberto decides not to reveal that Maria Dolores is not his real mother, Cristina, a hospital volunteer,  played by Erika Buenfil falls in love with him.  Cristina is the adopted and grown up daughter of Matilde, who happens to be Alberto's real life aunt.

Alberto develops a relationship with the Del Junco family as Cristina introduces him to everyone. The Del Juncos', with exception of spiteful Matilde are taken by the young man. Maria Elena in fact, feels a special  bond for her niece's boyfriend.  Maria Elena is by then a nun living in a convent resigned a long time ago to never finding her son and her beloved nana.

A dramatic turn of events happens when Don Rafael del Junco pays an unsuspecting Maria Dolores a visit after he is given an emergency blood transfusion by Alberto.  The meeting of these two characters is the paramount event of the entire drama as Maria Dolores reveals to Don Rafael that Doctor Alberto Limonta, the blood donor is in fact the Del Junco heir sent to his death by his own grandfather.

Don Rafael gets home and has a stroke which leaves him immobilized and unable to speak.  This ploy prologued the drama for months in which Alberto and Cristina's love story takes a secondary role to the quest by Don Rafael's desire and his inability to tell Maria Elena that Albertico is her son. Maria Elena, eventually meets Maria Dolores who reveals that she had to flee Veracruz to save the child.  In a highly emotional episode, Maria Elena, and Maria Dolores tell Alberto the entire truth.

Alberto instead of happiness feels sadness and resentment as he believes that Cristina is his first cousin making them an unlikely pair to marry.  It is then when Matilde plagued by remorse and sadness confesses to Cristina that she is adopted; hence, permitting the two to marry. Don Rafael now able to speak, wants Alberto to take the Del Junco name to which Alberto refuses and decides to keep Limonta instead as he had grown up with him.

Cast 

Verónica Castro as María Elena del Junco
Sergio Jiménez as Jorge Luis Armenteros
Ignacio López Tarso as Don Rafael del Junco
María Rubio as Clemencia del Junco
Humberto Zurita as Alberto Limonta
Salvador Pineda as Alfredo Martínez
Socorro Avelar as María Dolores Limonta
Erika Buenfil as Isabel Cristina del Río
Beatriz Castro as Matilde del Junco
Cristian Castro as Alberto (child)
Malena Doria as Sor Julia
Laura Flores as Amelia Montero
Miguel Macía as Alejandro Sierra
Miguel Ángel Ferriz as Osvaldo Martínez
Fernando Balzaretti as Ricardo del Río
Alba Nydia Díaz as Virginia
Manuel Ojeda as Armando
Julio César Inbert as Bruno
Eduardo Liñán as Father Juan
Flor Trujillo as Magali
Adriana Lafan as Marina
Hector Saez as Ramón
Carlos Ignacio as Raúl
Roberto Antunez as Alfonso Cabrera
Martha Patricia as Asunción
Maristel Molina as Sor Amparo
Andaluz Russel as Lolita
José Luis Duvall as Salvador
Julio Monterde as Nicolás Montero
Rosalba Hernández as Nurse
Alberto Parra as Tony
Jorge del Campo as Pepe
Macario Álvarez as Lic. Álvarez
Fabio Ramírez as Uncle Pepe
Margarita de la O as Josefa
Silvia Manríquez as Tete
Lorena Rivero as Gina
Carmen Rodríguez as Alma
Adrián Sotomayor as Adrián
Enrique Mazin as Doctor Jorge
Patricia Renteria as Rosita
Félix Santaella as Pedro Reyna
Norma Herrera as María
Héctor Suárez as Héctor
Aurora Medina as Lucía
Michel Castro as Alberto (newborn)José Luis Llamas as Advisor in AAMaría Belzares as BenitaLili Garza as InvitedBeatriz Ornella as InvitedMelba Luna as MercedesRaquel Pankowsky as Cristina (mother)Rigoberto Carmona as Waiter Other versions 
Films
 El derecho de nacer in 1952. Starring Jorge Mistral, Gloria Marín and Martha Roth.
 El derecho de nacer in 1966. Starring Aurora Bautista, Julio Alemán and Maricruz Olivier.
Telenovelas
 El derecho de nacer in 1966. Starring María Teresa Rivas and Enrique Rambal.
 El derecho de nacer'' in 2001. Starring Kate del Castillo and Saúl Lisazo.

Awards

References

External links 

Russian telenovela site.

1981 telenovelas
Mexican telenovelas
Televisa telenovelas
1981 Mexican television series debuts
1981 Mexican television series endings
Spanish-language telenovelas
Television shows set in Veracruz